Haitong Securities is a securities firm in China, providing services in stocks and futures brokerage, as well as investment banking, corporate finance, M&A, asset management, mutual fund, and private equity.

Haitong was listed on the Shanghai Stock Exchange in July 2007 and has a market capitalization of more than $17.9 billion.

History
Haitong was founded in 1988 in mainland China. In April 2012, it IPO'd after two tries (December 2011 was cancelled due to market conditions), in Hong Kong. It began trading in the Hong Kong Stock Exchange on April 27, 2012.

In 2015, Haitong Securities completed the purchase of BESI, the investment banking operations of Portuguese bank Novo Banco.

In 2019, Haitong Securities Co., Ltd. appoints Mao Yuxing as Deputy General Manager.

On July 24, 2021, the China Securities Regulatory Commission released the "2021 Securities Company Classification Results", in which Haitong Securities was rated BBB, a significant decrease from the AA level in 2020.

Business areas
Its business includes brokerage, investment banking, M&A, asset management, funds, margin trading, short selling, futures, and PE investment. It has the second-highest total assets and net assets in the sector, with the net asset reaching RMB 45 bn by the end of 2011. The company has 220 securities offices nationwide, 4mn retail customers, over 10,000 institutional and high-end customers, and customers' assets up to nearly RMB 1 trillion.

Investment banking
Haitong has an investment banking division, known for financial and high-tech enterprise underwritings as well as M&A and restructuring of cultural media enterprises.

Private equity
As the earliest securities company engaged in PE investment in mainland China, Haitong wholly owns or obtains controlling shareholding of four PE investment fund management companies including Haitong Capital Investment Co., Ltd. and Haitong-Fortis Private Equity Fund Management Co.

Cross border
Haitong puts emphasis on QFII, cross-border mergers, RMB funds and cross-border ETF, and ranks among the top three companies in the sector by QFII transaction amount. The company successfully purchased Taifook Securities, an old-brand securities broker in Hong Kong. Taifook Securities was renamed as "Haitong International Securities Group Co., Ltd. to actively facilitate the integration of domestic and overseas businesses. The company initiated the establishment of Fortis-Haitong Investment Management Co., Ltd., Haitong-Fortis Private Equity Fund Management Co., Haitong Capital Investment Co., Ltd. and Haitong International Holdings Limited., and obtained controlling shareholding of Haitong Futures Co., Ltd.

See also 
 Securities industry in China

References

External links
Haitong Securities Company Limited

Companies listed on the Shanghai Stock Exchange
Companies in the CSI 100 Index
Companies listed on the Hong Kong Stock Exchange
Financial services companies established in 1988
Companies based in Shanghai
Investment banks in China
Private equity firms of China
Government-owned companies of China
Financial services companies of China
H shares